The sirwal or shalwar forms part of traditional costume in some parts of Europe.

Sharavary suits
The salvar is known as sharavary in parts of Europe which is worn with any upper garment. In Ukraine, the sharavary is voluminous.  In Circassia, women wear the sharavary with a long shirt.

Kat-haljina suit
In Bosnia and Herzegovina and Montenegro, the salvar is known as the dimije which has a local style. The kat-haljina suit is a combination of a European style blouse and dimije made from the same material.

Bulgaria
The salvar and similar trousers are also worn in Bulgaria.

Schalwar/vraka
In parts of Greece (such as Crete, the Greek islands and Cyprus) and Macedonia, the salvar is known as vraka.

Photo gallery

References

Ukrainian folk clothing